Intermarine is an Italian shipbuilding company, owned by the Rodriquez Cantieri Navali Group.

Company
Founded in 1970, Intermarine has specialized in building boats and ships with fibre-reinforced plastic hulls.

In September 2002, the company was acquired by Rodriquez Cantieri Navali, a shipbuilder focusing on high-speed vessels.  This led to Intermarine introducing ships built out of steel and aluminum, using technology from their parent company.

Rodriquez owns four shipyards on the west coast of Italy, all of which Intermarine has access to for production.  A third shipyard was run in the United States by the subcompany Intermarine USA following the purchase of the Sayler Marine Corporation shipyard in Savannah, Georgia in 1987, but by the 2002 acquisition by Rodriquez, this yard was no longer owned by the company.

At 31 December 2015, the activity mainly consisted of the contract with the Italian Navy (for a total of 176 million euros) relating to the modernization of eight Gaeta-class minesweepers, the contract with the Finnish Navy for the supply of three minesweeper units and related logistic package, from the contract with Orizzonte Sistemi Navali for the supply of a Navigating Platform and related logistic package.

Products
Intermarine builds exclusively military ships in three designs.  
Minesweepers are ships designed for the disposal of mines, and which Intermarine's composite construction is well suited for, as the high elasticity of composite hull is flexible enough to absorb the energy from a mine blast at close range without significant damage. Intermarine has built 38 of these vessels for seven customers, including three under construction for the Finnish Navy.
Intermarine has also built hydro-oceanographic ships for the Italian Navy.  The vessels are catamarans, and two have been built for the purposes of charting seafloor.
Intermarine has also begun producing patrol boats, of which five are under construction, but none have yet been delivered.  The vessels are produced with either composite or aluminum hulls, and are capable of speeds above 50 knots.

Ships

Naval

 Italian Navy: Lerici-class minehunter
 Finnish Navy: Katanpää-class mine countermeasure vessel

See also

Azimut Yachts
Benetti
Fincantieri

References

External links
Home page 
Home page redirect 

Shipbuilding companies of Italy
Defence companies of Italy
Manufacturing companies established in 1970
Italian companies established in 1970
Italian brands